Hoesch AG was an important steel and mining company with locations in the Ruhr area and Siegen.

In 1871, Hoesch was founded by Leopold Hoesch. In 1938, Hoesch employed 30,000 people.

In 1972, the prominent steel producer merged with the Dutch Hoogovens steel company to form Estel.

It was formerly the largest employer in Dortmund. In 1982, the merger with Dutch company Estel was stopped by Detlev Karsten Rohwedder, and Hoesch became again an own company. In 1991, German competitor Krupp bought Hoesch.

Nazi involvement
Friedrich Springorum represented Hoesch AG at the Secret Meeting of 20 February 1933, at which prominent industrialists met with Adolf Hitler to finance the Nazi Party. After the Nazis came to power in 1933, Hoesch served as an armaments company producing Panther and Tiger II tank casings, tank ammunition, gun barrels and armor plate. During World War II, the company made extensive use of forced laborers. In December 1944, over one-third of the workers at Hüttenwerk Hoesch were forced laborers.

See also
Friedrich Springorum

References

External links
 

Defunct companies of Germany
1871 establishments in Germany
Steel companies of Germany
Manufacturing companies established in 1871
Krupp
Manufacturing companies based in Dortmund